The NSDAP/AO is an American neo-Nazi organization. It was founded in 1972 by United States citizen Gary Rex Lauck (born in 1953) in Fairbury, Nebraska. The organization's name stands for "NSDAP Aufbau- und Auslandsorganisation" ("NSDAP Development and Foreign Organization").

Lauck's organization claims to be a continuation of the original NSDAP – the German initials for the full name of the Nazi Party – and supplies neo-Nazis worldwide with propaganda material. Since 1973 this new NSDAP/AO publishes neo-Nazi magazines – "NS-Kampfruf", for example – by his own account in ten languages. As one of its political aims it demands the readmission of the NSDAP as an eligible party in Germany and Austria. The group has also been active in a number of countries across Europe, both co-ordinating with local movements and distributing propaganda individually.

References

External links
 NSDAP/AO
 'Farmbelt Fuehrer' loses web case, BBC News, January 25, 2002.
 When Laws Conflict, Intelligence Report, Issue Number 103, Fall 2001
 Elliot Welles: A Survivor Faces A New 'Fuhrer', Anti-Defamation League, Press Release, May 22, 1996
 Nancy Finken: Nebraska's Nazi, Nebraska Public Radio, March 24, 1995 (quoted after Statewide, Nebraska's weekly news journal)
 Nazi Lauck NSDAP/AO

Neo-Nazi organizations in the United States
Organizations established in 1972
Organizations based in Lincoln, Nebraska